Roadrunner United was a project organized by American heavy metal record label Roadrunner Records to celebrate its 25th anniversary. It culminated in an album released worldwide on October 11, 2005, entitled The All-Star Sessions. Four "team captains" were chosen to lead 57 artists from 45 past and present Roadrunner bands, and produce and oversee the album's 18 tracks: then-Slipknot drummer Joey Jordison, Trivium frontman and guitarist Matt Heafy, Fear Factory guitarist Dino Cazares, and Machine Head frontman and guitarist Robb Flynn. The project was the brainchild of Roadrunner UK general manager Mark Palmer and Roadrunner USA VP of A&R Monte Conner. The album project was coordinated by Lora Richardson and was mixed by Colin Richardson and Andy Sneap. The All-Star Sessions spawned one single and music video ("The End"). The DVD included with the CD purchase is a documentary of the "Making Of" the songs. It features the sessions of the four team captains making their songs.

On October 13, 2008, Roadrunner Records announced that a two-disc DVD of a release party-concert, featuring songs from the album performed live, would be released on December 9, 2008. The DVD features the full concert and a documentary.

The All-Star Sessions

Track listing

(C) - Denotes the captain for the song.

Personnel

Team Captains 

The following were the primary songwriters/producers for the album and were referred to as the 'Team Captains', each getting to select the musicians they wanted for each song.
Robb Flynn - co-lead vocals (track 1), keyboards (tracks 7, 9), rhythm guitar, production (1, 7, 9, 16)
Dino Cazares - rhythm guitar, production (tracks 2, 5, 11, 17)
Joey Jordison - bass (tracks 6, 10), drums, production (tracks 3, 6, 10, 14, 18)
Matt Heafy - lead vocals (track 5), backing vocals (tracks 8, 13), acoustic guitar (tracks 4, 13), lead and rhythm guitar, production (tracks 4, 8, 13, 15)

Vocalists 
Howard Jones - (co-lead) (track 1)
Mark Hunter (track 2)
Glen Benton (track 3)
King Diamond (track 4)¨
Matt Heafy (track 5)
Mina Caputo (track 6)
Max Cavalera (track 7)
Dani Filth (track 8)
Corey Taylor (track 9)
Daryl Palumbo (track 10)
Dez Fafara (track 11)
Mikael Åkerfeldt (track 12)
Jesse Leach (track 13)
Kyle Thomas (track 14)
Michale Graves (track 15)
Tim Williams (track 16)
Cristian Machado (track 17)
Peter Steele (track 18)

Guitarists 
Jordan Whelan - rhythm (tracks 1, 7, 9, 16)
Jeff Waters - lead (tracks 1, 7)
Andreas Kisser - lead (tracks 2, 11) co-lead (track 17)
Matt DeVries - rhythm (tracks 3, 14)
Rob Barrett - rhythm (tracks 3, 14), co-lead (track 14)
James Murphy - lead (track 3), intro lead (track 14)
Corey Beaulieu - rhythm & lead (track 4)
Logan Mader - harmonics (track 5)
Matt Baumbach - rhythm (tracks 6, 10), lead (track 10)
Tom Niemeyer - rhythm (track 6)
Acey Slade - rhythm (track 6)
Jim Root - lead (track 6)
Justin Hagberg - rhythm (tracks 8, 15)
Josh Rand - rhythm (track 13)
Andy LaRocque - co-lead (track 14)
Mike Sarkisyan - co-lead (track 17)
Steve Holt - rhythm & acoustic (track 18)

Bassists 
Christian Olde Wolbers (tracks 1, 7, 9, 16)
Paul Gray (tracks 2, 11)
Steve DiGiorgio (tracks 3, 14)
Mike D'Antonio (tracks 4, 13, 15)
Nadja Peulen (track 5)
Sean Malone (track 8)
Marcelo Dias (track 17)
Dave Pybus (track 18)

Drummers 
Andols Herrick (tracks 1, 7, 9, 16)
Joey Jordison (track  3)
Roy Mayorga (tracks 2, 5, 11)
Dave Chavarri (tracks 4, 15)
Mike Smith (track 8)
Johnny Kelly (track 13)
Dave McClain (track 17)

Keyboards/Programming 
Rhys Fulber (track 5)
Junkie XL (track 10)
Josh Silver (tracks 12, 18), backing vocals (track 12)
Peter Steele (track 18)

Engineers 
Matt Sepanic (tracks 3, 6, 10, 14, 18)
Jason Suecof (tracks (4, 8, 13, 15)
Roy Mayorga (tracks 2, 5, 11, 17)
Mark Keaton (tracks 1, 7, 9, 16)

Charts

Roadrunner United: The Concert

A concert celebrating the project, album and anniversary took place on Thursday December 15, 2005, at the Nokia Theater in New York City. The concert featured multiple musicians both past and present from Roadrunner bands, as well as musicians that did not originally perform on the All-Star Sessions album. The set list consisted of some of the most popular and famous songs released by Roadrunner Records as well as some of the original songs from the project's album. The 'core band', who performed on the majority of the songs, was Dino Cazares, Adam Duce, Paul Gray, Joey Jordison, Andreas Kisser, and Roy Mayorga.

Set list

References

External links
 Official website (archived)

Roadrunner Records albums
Heavy metal supergroups
2005 albums
2005 video albums
Documentary films about heavy metal music and musicians
2008 live albums
2008 video albums
Live video albums
Roadrunner Records live albums
Roadrunner Records video albums
Musical groups established in 2005